Nurpur Lubhana  is a village in Kapurthala district of Punjab State, India. The village is administrated by a Sarpanch, who is an elected representative.

Demography 
According to the report published by Census India in 2011, Nurpur Lubhana has total number of 334 houses and population of 1,525 of which include 793 males and 732 females. Literacy rate of Nurpur Lubhana is 86.17%, higher than state average of 75.84%.  The population of children under the age of 6 years is 173 which is 11.34% of total population of Nurpur Lubhana, and child sex ratio is approximately 713, lower than state average of 846.

As per census 2011, 628 people were engaged in work activities out of the total population of Nurpur Lubhana which includes 401 males and 227 females. According to census survey report 2011, 84.87% workers describe their work as main work and 15.13% workers are involved in Marginal activity providing livelihood for less than 6 months.

Population data

Air travel connectivity 
The closest airport to the village is Sri Guru Ram Dass Jee International Airport.

Villages in Kapurthala

References

External links
  Villages in Kapurthala
 Kapurthala Villages List

Villages in Kapurthala district